Angie Cruz (born February 24, 1972) is an American novelist and associate professor at the University of Pittsburgh, where she teaches in the M.F.A. program.

Early life and education
Cruz was born on February 24, 1972, in Washington Heights, New York City. She is of Dominican descent, and regularly travelled from New York City to the Dominican Republic as a child.

Cruz attended Catholic school through eighth grade and grew interested in visual arts in high school. She attended LaGuardia School of the Arts and the Fashion Institute of Technology, where she studied fashion design. She received her B.A. in English from SUNY Binghamton and an MFA in creative writing from New York University.

Career
Cruz has written numerous books focusing on themes of home, gender, race, displacement, and working class life.

Cruz published her first novel Soledad in 2001 and her second novel, Let It Rain Coffee in 2005, both with Simon & Schuster. Her third novel, Dominicana (2019), which she published with Flatiron Books, received widespread acclaim. Publishers Weekly described the work as "Enthralling...Cruz's winning novel will linger in the reader’s mind long after the close of the story." NBC described Dominicana as "one of the most evocative and empowering immigrant stories of our time." In 2022, Cruz published her fourth novel, How Not to Drown in a Glass of Water, also with Flatiron Books.

Cruz is currently an associate professor at the University of Pittsburgh writing program and the Editor-in-Chief, Publisher and Founder of Aster(ix) literary journal.

Awards
Cruz has received numerous grants for her teaching and writing, including the Barbara Deming Award, New York Foundation for the Arts Fellowship, Camargo Fellowship, Van Lier Literary Fellowship, and NALAC Fund for the Arts Fellowship. She has also been awarded residencies: Yaddo, The Macdowell Colony, Fundacion Valparaiso, La Napoule Foundation and The Millay Colony.

Dominicana was shortlisted for the 2020 Women's Prize for Fiction. In 2020, Dominicana received the Alex Awards.

In 2021, Cruz was awarded the Gina Berriault Award. The award is given annually to a writer who has shown a love for storytelling and a commitment to helping young writers.

Novels

References

External links 

Introductory arts article about Cruz
Article by Angie Cruz about Washington Heights
Article on Dominicans living in NYC in which Angie Cruz is quoted
Conversation between Cruz and fellow novelist Nelly Rosario

21st-century American novelists
Dominican Republic novelists
American writers of Dominican Republic descent
Postcolonial literature
Dominican Republic women writers
Living people
1972 births
Texas A&M University faculty
Hispanic and Latino American novelists
University of Pittsburgh faculty
American women novelists
21st-century American women writers
Novelists from Pennsylvania
Novelists from Texas